William Neal Gillies (27 October 1868 – 9 February 1928) was an Australian politician who served as Labor Premier of Queensland from 26 February 1925 to 22 October 1925.

Early life
Gillies was born in Eccleston, New South Wales (in the Allyn River district), the son of Dougald Gillies, farmer, and his wife Mary (née Gillies), both parents being Scottish immigrants. Gillies was educated at local schools and in 1882 went with his parents to the Village of Tintenbar in the Richmond River country. There he took up farming including sugar-cane growing, and began to be interested in public affairs.

In 1900, Gillies married Margaret Smith.

Political career
He was an active member of the anti-alien league, and afterwards became president of the New South Wales sugar growers defence league. In the federal election of 1910 he stood unsuccessfully as a Labour candidate for the Richmond seat, and was again defeated when he stood for the New South Wales Legislative Assembly in the same district.

Late in 1910 Gillies took up land in Queensland and in 1912 won the Eacham seat for Labour in the Legislative Assembly of Queensland despite a charge of falsely stating his period of residence on an electoral claim. He held this seat until his retirement from politics.

Gillies was assistant-minister for justice in the Thomas J. Ryan ministry from 25 April 1918 to September 1919 and for a few weeks until 22 October, was secretary for agriculture and stock. He held the last position in the Ted Theodore ministry from October 1919 till February 1925, and his practical experience as a farmer was found to be of great use. Many amendments were made in existing legislation relating to agriculture and no fewer than 14 new measures were passed. This period was marked by the establishment of the cotton industry and the stabilization of the sugar and farming industries.

On the resignation of Theodore, Gillies became premier on 26 February 1925, taking the positions of chief secretary and treasurer, and vice-president of the executive council. He was premier during a period of great labour unrest with constantly occurring strikes. Gillies was a man of moderate views and he found the more extreme section of the party very active, and he was beset with anxieties. He compromised as much as possible, but on 27 October 1925 was glad to resign and become a member of the newly established board of trade and arbitration. He gave much study to the problems to be dealt with and carried out his work with conspicuous fairness. He, however, felt the strain very much and died suddenly on 9 February 1928.

Legacy
Gillies was accorded a State funeral which took place from St Andrew's Presbyterian Church to his burial place at Toowong Cemetery.

The Gillies Highway in Far North Queensland was named after William Neil Gillies as he founded the Main Roads Board, which subsequently became the Department of Main Roads (now part of the Department of Transport and Main Roads).

References

External links

1868 births
1928 deaths
Australian Labor Party members of the Parliament of Queensland
Australian people of Scottish descent
Premiers of Queensland
Deputy Premiers of Queensland
Burials at Toowong Cemetery
Treasurers of Queensland